Elections were held in Nevada on November 2, 2010, for one seat in the U.S. Senate, three seats in the U.S. House of Representatives, the office of Governor of Nevada, and other state and local officials.  Primary elections took place on June 8, 2010.

Federal

United States Senate

Harry Reid, Nevada's Democratic incumbent Senator, won re-election.

United States House

All three of Nevada's seats in the United States House of Representatives were up for re-election in 2010. Incumbents Democrat Shelley Berkley in District 1 and Republican Dean Heller in District 2 won re-election. Democrat Dina Titus of District 3 was defeated by Republican Joe Heck.

State

Governor

Republican Governor Jim Gibbons lost his bid for re-election in the Republican primary election on June 8, 2010, to Brian Sandoval. Sandoval won the general election against Rory Reid.

Lieutenant governor
Incumbent Republican Lieutenant Governor Brian Krolicki won re-election.

Secretary of State
Incumbent Democratic Secretary of State Ross Miller won re-election.

Attorney general
Incumbent Democratic Attorney General Catherine Cortez Masto won re-election.

Treasurer
Incumbent Democratic Treasurer Kate Marshall won re-election.

Controller
Incumbent Democratic Controller Kim Wallin won re-election.

State Senate
Ten of the twenty-one seats of the Nevada Senate were up for election in 2010.

State House of Representatives
All forty-two seats in the Nevada Assembly were for election in 2010.

Judicial positions
Multiple judicial positions were up for election in 2010.
Nevada judicial elections, 2010 at Judgepedia

Ballot measures
Four ballot measures had been certified.
Nevada 2010 ballot measures at Ballotpedia

References

External links
Election Center of the Nevada Secretary of State
Candidates for Nevada State Offices at Project Vote Smart
Nevada Polls at Pollster.com
Nevada Congressional Races in 2010 campaign finance data from OpenSecrets
Nevada 2010 campaign finance data from Follow the Money
Election 2010 from Vegas PBS
 Imagine Election - Find out which candidates will appear on your ballot - search by address or zip code.

 
2010 elections in the United States by state